Ko So-young (born October 6, 1972) is a South Korean actress and model.

Early life
Ko was born in Seoul, South Korea. She attended an all-female high school before gaining early admission to Chung-Ang University, where she studied computer science.

Career
Ko debuted in the TV drama Love Tomorrow in 1993 and quickly established herself as a representative star of her generation. She made her film debut opposite Jung Woo-sung in The Fox with Nine Tails in 1994, which was the first Korean film to use computer-generated imagery. However, it failed to make an impression on audiences or critics. Ko first achieved wide recognition through her role in Beat (again with Jung Woo-sung), a film that caught the imagination of many South Korean high school students. Since then she has acted in a series of successful melodramas, portraying a young model in If the Sun Rises in the West, a Jeju Island tour guide in Love Wind Love Song, and a Korean American adoptee in Love.

In 2001, Ko teamed up with actor Lee Sung-jae in A Day, about a married couple who have trouble conceiving a child. Her acting in the film was much praised and garnered the Best Actress prize from the local Grand Bell Awards ceremony. Then, after two years off, Ko returned in 2003 opposite Han Suk-kyu in the spy thriller Double Agent; however, the film failed to live up to the expectations of most viewers and critics. She then shot two films in 2006: the horror film APT by director Ahn Byeong-ki, and the romantic comedy Project Makeover by debut director Jeon Young-gap. After two commercial flops in 2007 with Project Makeover and the SBS drama Blue Fish, Ko went into a hiatus.

A decade after her last appearance, Ko made a comeback with the KBS drama Ms. Perfect.

Personal life
Ko married actor Jang Dong-gun in a star-studded wedding ceremony held at Seoul's Shilla Hotel on May 2, 2010, while five months pregnant. The couple's first child, a son Jang Min-joon, was born on October 4, 2010.
Their second child, a daughter, was born on February 25, 2014.

Filmography

Films

Television series

References

External links

Ko So-young at Koreanfilm.org
 

South Korean film actresses
South Korean television actresses
South Korean female models
Chung-Ang University alumni
1972 births
Living people
Actresses from Seoul
Models from Seoul